Solihull College & University Centre, formerly called Solihull Technical College, is a further education college located in the Metropolitan Borough of Solihull, in the West Midlands, England. The College has two main campuses; the Blossomfield Campus near central Solihull and the Woodlands Campus based in Smith's Wood, north Solihull. The acting Principal of the College is Lindsay Stewart with Rebecca Gater taking over in September 2022. 

Solihull College offers full-time, part-time, higher education courses, apprenticeships and bespoke employment training. Facilities include an animal welfare centre, virtual reality lab, industry-standard science labs and health & care skills suite at Blossomfield Campus and aircraft hangar and flight simulators, plus motor vehicle and construction workshops at Woodlands Campus.

In February 2018 the College merged with Stratford-upon-Avon College, increasing the size and influence of the combined college in the region. As of 2022 there have been no announcements that university college status will be forthcoming. 

Former Solihull College & University Centre students include Northern Ireland footballer Will Grigg, England footballer Gary Cahill, celebrity chef Glynn Purnell and film director Malcolm Venville.

Courses
Solihull College offers a variety of courses ranging from vocational courses to foundation-level programmes and apprenticeships. The College also offers a variety of university-level qualifications including HNCs and HNDs, foundation degrees, top-up degrees, master's degrees and full BA degrees. A number of the higher education qualifications are accredited by the likes of Oxford Brookes University, University of Northampton, Coventry University and Newman University. Part-time courses, distance learning programmes and community courses are also offered by the college.

See also 
 Education in England
 Further Education
 Solihull
 The Sixth Form College, Solihull

External links
 
 Ofsted Report

Education in Solihull
Further education colleges in the West Midlands (county)